Mary M. Frasier (1938–2005) was a famous African American educator who specialized in the area of gifted education at the University of Georgia.

Frasier was born May 17, 1938, in South Carolina.
 
Frasier worked to elevate the educational standing of African Americans as well as other minority groups who pass through the educational system, and transformed how people viewed gifted children. She developed the Frasier Traits, Aptitudes, and Behaviors (F-TAB), which is an instrument used by many school systems to identify children for gifted educational services.

Frasier  received a bachelor's in music education and a master's in  guidance and counseling from South Carolina State College. She earned her PhD in educational psychology from the University of Connecticut.

She died February 3, 2005, in Athens, Georgia.

References

Colleagues Pay Tribute to Gifted Education Pioneer Mary M. Frasier, UGA College of Education Online News, February 9, 2005

1938 births
2005 deaths
20th-century African-American women
20th-century African-American people
20th-century African-American educators
21st-century African-American people
21st-century African-American women
Schoolteachers from South Carolina
20th-century American women educators
University of Georgia faculty
20th-century American educators
American women academics